Andrei Vladimirovich Razin (born 23 October 1973), is a Russian former professional ice hockey player. Razin was selected by the Philadelphia Flyers in the 6th round (177th overall) of the 2001 NHL Entry Draft.

Career statistics

Regular season and playoffs

International

External links

1973 births
Avangard Omsk players
HC CSKA Moscow players
HC Dynamo Moscow players
HC Lada Togliatti players
Metallurg Magnitogorsk players
HC MVD players
Living people
Sportspeople from Tolyatti
Philadelphia Flyers draft picks
Russian ice hockey centres
Russian ice hockey coaches